This is a list of mayors of Brig, Switzerland. Brig is a former municipality of the canton of Valais. It merged in 1973 with Glis and Brigerbad to form Brig-Glis. 

For later mayors, see:
List of mayors of Brig-Glis

Brig
 
Lists of mayors (complete 1900-2013)